Two-time defending champion Shingo Kunieda defeated Stéphane Houdet in the final, 6–2, 6–4 to win the men's singles wheelchair tennis title at the 2009 Australian Open. It was his third Australian Open singles title and sixth major singles title overall.

Seeds
 Shingo Kunieda (champion)
 Robin Ammerlaan (first round)

Draw

Finals

Wheelchair Men's Singles
2009 Men's Singles